The 2022 Barcelona Formula 3 round was a motor racing event held on 21 and 22 May 2022 at the Circuit de Barcelona-Catalunya, Montmeló, Catalonia, Spain. It was the third round of the 2022 FIA Formula 3 Championship, and was held in support of the 2022 Spanish Grand Prix.

Classification

Qualifying 
Trident driver Roman Staněk achieved his maiden pole position in Formula 3 ahead of championship leader Victor Martins and Alexander Smolyar.

Notes:

 – Zane Maloney originally qualified in twelfth place, but was forced to start from the pitlane in both races due to missing the weighbridge during the first half of qualifying.

Sprint Race

Feature race 

Notes:

 – Arthur Leclerc originally finished eleventh, but was given a total of ten-second-time penalties for both causing a collision with David Vidales and due to erratic driving while battling against Juan Manuel Correa.
 – Ido Cohen received a five-second-time penalty for causing a collision with Kush Maini.
 – Enzo Trulli received a five-second-time penalty for causing a collision with Brad Benavides.

Standings after the event 

Drivers' Championship standings

Teams' Championship standings

 Note: Only the top five positions are included for both sets of standings.

See also 
 2022 Spanish Grand Prix
 2022 Barcelona Formula 2 round

Notes

References

External links 
 Official website

|- style="text-align:center"
|width="35%"|Previous race:
|width="30%"|FIA Formula 3 Championship2022 season
|width="40%"|Next race:

Circuit de Barcelona-Catalunya
Barcelona Formula 3
Barcelona Formula 3 round